The 2021–22 Premier League was the 30th season of the Premier League, the top English professional league for association football clubs since its establishment in 1992, and the 123rd season of top-flight English football overall. The start and end dates for the season were released on 25 March 2021, and the fixtures were released on 16 June 2021.

Manchester City successfully defended their title, securing a sixth Premier League title and eighth English league title overall on the final day of the season; it was also the club's fourth title in the last five seasons.

Summary 
Manchester City were the defending champions, having won their fifth Premier League title during the previous season.

This season saw the return of full attendance, after the final third of the 2019–20 and the entirety of the 2020–21 seasons were held with limited or no attendance due to the restrictions caused by the COVID-19 pandemic. This season was the second season to feature a winter break, with no Premier League matches scheduled between 23 January and 7 February 2022.

The race for first place 
The early title race was dominated by Liverpool, Manchester City and Chelsea, who were separated by two points by early December. By December, Chelsea led the way following a run of just one defeat in 14 matches until a shock defeat to West Ham United gave City the edge. A run of 12 consecutive victories, concluding in a victory over Chelsea that essentially ended their title hopes, gave Manchester City a 13 point lead by January (though Liverpool had two games in hand due to COVID-19 postponements). Liverpool then went on a 10 game winning run, including both their games in hand, to cut City's lead to a single point ahead of their meeting at the Etihad on 10 April. A 2-2 draw retained City's narrow lead going into the final weeks of the season.

Newcastle takeover 

On 7 October, Saudi Arabia's Public Investment Fund purchased an 80% stake and completed the £300m takeover of Newcastle United, ending the 14 year ownership of Mike Ashley. On 12 October 2021, an emergency meeting was convened by the other 19 Premier League clubs between themselves and the Premier League, where they voiced their anger at the league's decision to ratify the takeover; Newcastle United were the only Premier League club to be excluded from attending the meeting. On 18 November 2021, Premier League clubs voted to tighten the Premier League's financial controls in order to limit Newcastle United's spending power.

At the time of the takeover, Newcastle were in 19th position having failed to win any of their first seven games. The new ownership sacked Steve Bruce and hired Eddie Howe; while Newcastle did not win a game until the 15th attempt, their form improved dramatically after five signings in the January transfer window. A run of 12 wins in their final 18 games secured an 11th place finish.

COVID-19 outbreaks force postponements 

In December 2021, multiple matches were postponed due to the COVID-19 outbreaks in multiple clubs, with many clubs calling for the league to shut down until 2022. Following a meeting on 20 December involving all 20 Premier League clubs, a decision was made to fulfil the fixtures over the Christmas period "where it is safe to do so". Clubs were advised that if they had 13 fit players, plus a goalkeeper, then they should fulfil their fixtures.

Abramovich sanctions 

On 2 March, Roman Abramovich announced that he planned to sell Chelsea, stating his intent to donate all proceeds of the sale to the victims of the war in Ukraine. In the following days, numerous reports about interested buyers surfaced including Swiss billionaire Hansjörg Wyss, Los Angeles Dodgers and Lakers shareholder Todd Boehly, Pakistani businessman Javed Afridi, and other unnamed parties. 

On 10 March, the British government froze all of Roman Abramovich's assets due to his close personal ties with Vladimir Putin, leaving Chelsea unable to sell tickets or merchandise, buy or sell players, and negotiate contracts. The UK government issued Chelsea a licence that allowed the club to continue footballing activities, ensured that employees continued to be paid, and allowed season-ticket holders to continue to attend games.

Final day climax 
The end of the season saw the title race, Champions League, Europa League, Conference League qualifications, and the relegation battle all decided on the final day for the first time in Premier League history.

Title 

Heading into the final day of the season, Manchester City led by a solitary point, meaning City needed to match or better Liverpool's result to clinch back-to-back titles. Liverpool needed to win and hope that Manchester City dropped points to Aston Villa, managed by former Liverpool captain Steven Gerrard.
 
Liverpool went behind to Wolves in the 3rd minute, but quickly equalised. Aston Villa took a shock 2–0 lead after 63 minutes thanks to goals from Matty Cash and Philippe Coutinho. Manchester City then scored three goals (from substitute Ilkay Gundogan and Rodri) in under six minutes to take the lead in the match. Two late goals from Liverpool meant they won their game 3–1, but the final results confirmed City as champions for the fourth time in five seasons.

Relegation 
Norwich City, who were promoted from the Championship last season, suffered relegation with four games to spare following a 10th loss in 12 matches, against Aston Villa. Norwich also recorded the worst goal difference since Derby County in 2007–08. The next weekend Watford, who were also promoted, were the second to go down after defeat to Crystal Palace.

The final relegation spot was contested by Everton, Burnley and Leeds United, all of whom spent time in the bottom three in the final months of the season. Everton endured a run of just three wins between October and April, but victories against Manchester United, Chelsea and Leicester City meant that victory over Crystal Palace in their final home game of the season would secure safety. Although they went 2–0 down at half time, Dominic Calvert-Lewin's goal in the 85th minute to put Everton 3–2 ahead had fans invading the pitch. Fans stormed the pitch again at full time, after avoiding what would have been the club's first relegation since 1951 and prolonging their top-flight status for a 69th year running.

Burnley and Leeds went into the final day level on 35 points, with Burnley having the edge over Leeds due to a superior goal difference. Burnley fell behind 2–0 to Newcastle, while a Raphinha penalty put Leeds ahead in the 54th minute. A 78th minute equaliser from Brentford and a Maxwel Cornet goal gave Burnley hope of survival, but an added time winner from Jack Harrison confirmed safety for Leeds and relegated Burnley after six consecutive seasons in the Premier League.

Champions League, Europa League and Conference League spots 
With Chelsea securing a top-four finish for a fourth straight season, only Tottenham and Arsenal were in the hunt for the final Champions League spot. Arsenal were in 4th with three games remaining, but Arsenal's defeats against Tottenham in the North London derby and Newcastle in their final away game combined with Tottenham victory against Burnley in their final home game saw Tottenham leapfrog them with one game remaining. Spurs just needed a point against already relegated Norwich on the final day to secure Champions League qualification for the first time in three years, and won 5–0 with two goals from Son Heung-min, who secured a joint Golden Boot with Mohamed Salah. Arsenal failed to qualify for the Champions League for a fifth season, despite beating Everton 5–1.

Manchester United, despite the return of Cristiano Ronaldo, announced the departure of Ole Gunnar Solskjær on 21 November. Results did not improve under Ralf Rangnick as they were already out of the Champions League after posting a goal difference of zero and finishing with their worst points tally in the Premier League era. However, despite losing 1–0 at Selhurst Park on the last day of the season, 58 points was enough for a Europa League spot following West Ham’s 3–1 defeat at Brighton, stopping them from qualifying for back-to-back Europa League spots; they instead had to settle for a spot in the Europa Conference League.

Other teams 
Brentford manager Thomas Frank had a promising first season in the Premier League. Thanks to January signing Christian Eriksen, the team won seven out of their last 11 games of the season, which included a 4–1 victory against Chelsea. The Dane guided the Bees to a 13th place finish, 11 points above the relegation zone and not spending a single week in the relegation zone.

Brighton had their best season in the top-flight with Graham Potter's side finishing ninth with a total of 51 points, despite their poor home record. Their 4–0 win against Manchester United was another new high for them, as it was also their biggest top-flight win.

Teams 
Twenty teams competed in the league – the top seventeen teams from the previous season and the three teams promoted from the Championship. The promoted teams were Norwich City, Watford (who both returned to the top flight after a year's absence) and Brentford (who returned to the top flight after a seventy-four year absence). This was also Brentford's first season in the Premier League. They replaced Fulham, West Bromwich Albion (both teams relegated after just one year in the top flight) and Sheffield United (relegated after a two-year top flight spell).

Stadiums and locations 

 Note: Table lists in alphabetical order. Source:

Personnel and kits 

a. Pierre-Emerick Aubameyang was club captain at Arsenal until 14 December 2021, when he was stripped of the captaincy following a disciplinary breach; he was later let go by the club on 1 February. Alexandre Lacazette served as the de facto captain until early February, when he was officially named to the role.
b. Troy Deeney was club captain at Watford at the start of the season, but left the club on 30 August. While a replacement captain has not yet been formally named by the club, Moussa Sissoko has been the de facto captain.
c.  Three and Hyundai suspended their sponsorships of Chelsea in response to sanctions imposed on the club and Roman Abramovich following the Russian invasion of Ukraine. The former does however remain on the club's shirt and will at least until a new kit is released the following season. Should the sponsorship be put back on hold, Three will remain Chelsea's shirt sponsor.

Managerial changes

League table

Results

Season statistics

Top scorers

Hat-tricks

Notes
4 Player scored 4 goals(H) – Home team(A) – Away team

Top assists

Clean sheets

Discipline

Player
 Most yellow cards: 11
 Junior Firpo (Leeds United)
 Tyrone Mings (Aston Villa)
 James Tarkowski (Burnley)

 Most red cards: 2
 Raúl Jiménez (Wolverhampton Wanderers)
 Ezri Konsa (Aston Villa)

Club
 Most yellow cards: 101
Leeds United

 Most red cards: 6
Everton

Awards

Monthly awards

Annual awards

References

External links 
 Official website

 
Premier League seasons
England
1